Pipe smoking is the practice of tasting (or, less commonly, inhaling) the smoke produced by burning a substance, most commonly tobacco and cannabis, in a pipe. It is the oldest traditional form of smoking. 

Regular pipe smoking has been cited to carry serious health risks including increased danger of various forms of cancer as well as pulmonary and cardiovascular illnesses.

History

A number of Native American cultures have pipe-smoking traditions, which have been part of their cultures since long before the arrival of Europeans. Tobacco is often smoked, generally for ceremonial purposes, though other mixtures of sacred herbs are also common. Various types of ceremonial pipes have been smoked in ceremony to seal covenants and treaties, most notably treaties of peace (hence the misnomer, "peace pipe"). Tobacco was introduced to Europe from the Americas in the sixteenth century and spread around the world rapidly.
In Asia during the nineteenth century, opium (which previously had only been eaten) was added to tobacco and smoked in pipes. Madak (the mixture of opium and tobacco) turned out to be far more addictive than orally-ingested opium, leading to social problems in China which culminated in the First (18391842) and Second Opium War (18561860).

According to Alfred Dunhill, Africans have had a long tradition of smoking hemp in gourd pipes, asserting that by 1884 the King of the Baluka tribe of the Congo had established a "riamba" or hemp-smoking cult in place of fetish-worship. Enormous gourd pipes were used.

In the twentieth century, pipe smoking was adopted as a preferred method of inhaling a variety of psychoactive drugs, and some claim it is a more intense method of ingestion. Smokeable crack cocaine has a reputation for being more addictive than cocaine's insufflated form. Similarly, methamphetamine has gained popularity in a crystalline form which when smoked in a pipe lets the user avoid the painful nasal irritation of snorting. When not applied to a cigarette or joint, the liquid form of PCP is typically smoked in a pipe with tobacco or cannabis.

Due in no small part to successful campaigning against tobacco use, sales of pipe tobacco in Canada fell nearly 80% in a recent fifteen-year period to 27,319 kilograms in 2016, from 135,010 kilograms in 2001, according to federal data. By comparison, Canadian cigarette sales fell about 32% in the same period to 28,600,000,000 units.

Pipes

Pipes have been fashioned from an assortment of materials including briar, clay, ceramic, corncob, glass, meerschaum, metal, gourd, stone, wood, bog oak and various combinations thereof, most notably, the classic English calabash pipe.

The size of a pipe, particularly the bowl, depends largely on what is intended to be smoked in it. Large western-style tobacco pipes are used for strong-tasting, harsh tobaccos, the smoke from which is usually not inhaled. Smaller pipes such as the midwakh or kiseru are used to inhale milder tobaccos such as dokha and kizami or other substances such as cannabis and opium.

Water pipes
Water pipes bubble smoke through water to cool and wash the smoke. The two basic types are stationary hookahs, with one or more long flexible drawtubes, and portable bongs.

Spoon pipes
Spoon pipes (glass pipes or glass bowl pipes) have become increasingly common with the rise of cannabis or other narcotics smoking. Spoon pipes are normally made of borosilicate glass to withstand repeated exposure to high temperatures. They consist of a bowl for packing material into, stem for inhaling, and a carbureter (carb) for controlling suction and airflow into the pipe. These pipes utilize a two step process. First, the user inhales while lighting the smoking material and holding down the carb, allowing smoke to fill the stem. Then, the user releases the carb while inhaling to allow air to enter the stem and smoke to be pulled into the user's mouth.

Health effects

The overall health risks are 10% higher in pipe smokers than in non-smokers. However, pipe or cigar smokers who are former-cigarette smokers might retain a habit of smoke inhalation. In such cases, there is a 30% increase in the risk of heart disease and a nearly three times greater risk of developing COPD. In addition, there is a causal relationship between pipe smoking and mortality due to lung and other cancers, as well as periodontal problems, such as tooth and bone loss.

However, all tobacco products deliver nicotine to the central nervous system, and there is a confirmed risk of dependence. Many forms of tobacco use are associated with a significantly increased risk of morbidity and premature mortality due to tobacco-related diseases.

Culture

The customs, vocabulary and etiquette that surround pipe smoking culture vary across the world and depend both on the people who are smoking and the substance being smoked.

For example, in many places in Europe and North America, tobacco pipe smoking has sometimes been seen as genteel or dignified and has given rise to a variety of customized accessories and even apparel such as the smoking jacket, and the former Pipe Smoker of the Year award in the UK, as well as the term kapnismology ("the study of smoke").

Notable pipe smokers

A number of real and fictional persons are strongly associated with the hobby of pipe smoking.

Men
Buzz Aldrin (b. 1930), American astronaut.
Louis Althusser, French philosopher.
Roald Amundsen, Norwegian explorer.
Sparky Anderson, American baseball manager.
Clement Attlee (1883–1967), UK Prime Minister (1945–51).
Johann Sebastian Bach, German composer. He wrote an aria about his fondness for pipe smoking: So oft ich meine Tobackspfeife BWV 515a.
Douglas Bader, British military pilot.
, Argentine writer.
Karl Barth, German theologian.
Zygmunt Baumann, Polish-British sociologist.
Enzo Bearzot, manager of the 1982 FIFA World Cup Champion Italy national football team.
Ludwig van Beethoven (1770–1827), German composer.
Tony Benn (1925–2014), long-serving British Member of Parliament.
Edgar Benson, Canadian Minister of Finance. 
Rómulo Betancourt (1908–1981), President of Venezuela.
Georges Brassens, French singer and guitarist.
Clarence "Gatemouth" Brown, American blues musician. An avid pipe smoker, the Texas-blues guitarist often sold his own proprietary blend of pipe tobacco as well as autographed pipes at his concerts and shows.
Abelardo Castillo, Argentine writer.
Graham Chapman (1941–1989), British actor and comedian (Monty Python).
Ben Chifley (1885–1951), Prime Minister of Australia (1945–1949).
Julio Cortázar, Argentine writer.
Jacques Cousteau, French documentary maker and oceanographer.
Bing Crosby (1903–1977), American singer and actor.
Bill Davis, Former Premier of Ontario.
Allen Welsh Dulles, American diplomat and lawyer who became the first civilian Director of Central Intelligence (DCI), and its longest-serving director to date.
Edward VIII, short-reigned (20 January-11 December 1936) King of the United Kingdom.
Albert Einstein (1879–1955), German scientist. He was known for smoking a pipe and once said, "I believe that pipe smoking contributes to a somewhat calm and objective judgment in all human affairs." 
Mircea Eliade, Romanian author and historian.
Akhteruzzaman Elias, Bangladeshi author and secular humanist.
William Faulkner, American author, known to be an enthusiastic proponent of pipe smoking.
Manuel Felguérez, Mexican artist.
Barry Fitzgerald, (1888–1961), Irish stage, film and television actor.
Gerald R. Ford (1913–2006), 38th President of the United States from 1974 to 1977.
Stephen Fry (b. 1957), English author, actor and comedian.
Clark Gable (1901–1960), American actor.
Theodor Seuss Geisel, German-American author, political cartoonist.
George Gissing, English author.
Cary Grant (1904–1986), British-American actor.
Günter Grass (1927–2015), German novelist.
Che Guevara (1928–1967), Argentinian revolutionary, who was known to enjoy a pipe from time to time, in addition to his usual cigar.
Dag Hammarskjöld, Swedish diplomat, spiritual diarist and second Secretary General of the United Nations Organisation.
Friedrich Hayek, Austrian-British economist who is well known for his classical liberalism.
Hugh Hefner (1926–2017), American publisher.
Ernest Hemingway (1899–1961), American novelist.
Earl Hines, American jazz musician.
Herbert Hoover (1874–1964), 31st President of the United States (1928–33). 
Edwin Hubble, American astronomer.
Burl Ives, American singer.
Mark Jones, English footballer.
Carl Jung, Swiss psychiatrist and psychoanalyst who founded analytical psychology.
Albert King, American blues singer and guitarist.
Helmut Kohl (1930–2017), German Chancellor (1982–1998).
Raaj Kumar, A popular Indian actor (1926–1996).
Bonar Law (1858–1923), Prime Minister of the United Kingdom (1922–1923).
Siegfried Lenz, German author.
C. S. Lewis, British author, theologian, professor.
Charles Lightoller, British maritime officer and survivor of the Sinking of the RMS Titanic.
Siegfried Lowitz, German actor.
Jack Lynch, Taoiseach (Prime Minister) of Ireland (1966–73, 1977–79).
Douglas MacArthur (1880–1964), American general, often photographed with his signature corncob pipe.
Harold Macmillan (1894–1986), Prime Minister of the United Kingdom (1957–1963)
Subcomandante Marcos, Mexican revolutionary.
Thabo Mbeki (b. 1942), President of South Africa (1999–2008).
John N. Mitchell (1913–1988), 67th Attorney General of the United States (1969–1972) under President Richard Nixon.
Eric Morecambe (1926–1984), British comedian.
Farley Mowat (1921–2014), Canadian author.
Charles Stewart Mott, GM executive, philanthropist, Flint Mayor.
Harry Mulisch, Dutch novelist. 
Pablo Neruda, Chilean poet. 
Sandro Pertini, Italian president.
Wolfgang Rihm, German composer
George Lincoln Rockwell, founder of the American Nazi Party.
Franklin D. Roosevelt (1882–1945), 32nd President of the United States (1932–45).
Bertrand Russell (1872–1970), British philosopher.
Eero Saarinen (1910–1961), Finnish-American architect.
Anwar Sadat (1918–1981), third President of Egypt (1970-81).
Jean-Paul Sartre, French littérateur and existential philosopher.
Antonin Scalia, American former supreme court justice.
Ronald Aylmer Fisher, British mathematician and geneticist, and the father of the modern biometrics and experimental statistics.
Helmut Schmidt (1918–2015), Chancellor of West Germany (1974-82).
Samuel J. Seymour (1860–1956), the last surviving person who had been present in Ford's Theatre the night of the assassination of U.S. President Abraham Lincoln on April 14, 1865.
Will Self, British author.
Georges Simenon, Belgian novelist. His most famous character, Jules Maigret, is also a pipe smoker.
Joseph Stalin (1878–1953), Premier of the USSR. He was frequently shown with a pipe: "Photos of him appeared daily in the Soviet press, now in genial pipe-smoking profile, now walking with his comrades..."
Jacques Tati, French actor, comedian and film director.
Josip Broz Tito, Yugoslav president-for-life. Commonly shown smoking cigarettes from a pipe. 
J. R. R. Tolkien (1892–1973), British novelist. The Hobbit and The Lord of the Rings have several detailed scenes of characters engaging in it. Tolkien himself was an avid pipe smoker.
Mark Twain (1835–1910), American author, a.k.a. Samuel Clemens, writer of Huckleberry Finn favored Missouri Meershaum corncob pipes. He was notoriously partial to a special blend of "Cuban leaf" pipe tobacco, remarking once that "If I cannot smoke in heaven, then I shall not go."
Edward Upward, British novelist.
Martin Van Buren (1782–1862), Eighth President of the United States (1837–41).
Lee Van Cleef, American actor (as the Bad in The Good, the Bad and the Ugly).
Vincent van Gogh (1853–1890), Dutch painter.
Paul Vanden Boeynants (1919–2001), Belgian Prime Minister.
Stevie Ray Vaughan, Texas blues musician guitar player and songwriter (1954–1990)
Alan Watts, British writer and speaker.
Harold Wilson (1916–1995), UK Prime Minister (1964–70, 1974–76).
Tapio Wirkkala (1915–1985), Finnish designer and sculptor.

Fictional characters
Bacicci, a sailor whose silhouette is featured on U.C. Sampdoria's club crest.
Olivier B. Bommel, Dutch comics character from Tom Poes.
César, Belgian comics character from Urbanus.
Cowboy Henk, Belgian comics character.
Frosty the Snowman, A fictional Christmas character, featured in both songs and cartoon films of the same name, that is always depicted and described as "With a corncob pipe and a button nose, and two eyes made out of coal". Such depictions likely suggests that Frosty was a pipe smoker, or at least an aesthetic pipe proprietor.
Snufkin, Finnish literary and comics character from The Moomins, though his pipe is absent in some incarnations. 
Captain Haddock, Belgian comic character from The Adventures of Tintin.
Sherlock Holmes, British literary character. He is explicitly described as a pipe smoker.
Monsieur Hulot, French film character.
Kapitein Rob, Dutch comics character.
M, British literary and film character (James Bond).
Miss Alma LeFay Peregrine, of Miss Peregrine's Home for Peculiar Children.
Jules Maigret, Belgian literary character, created by Georges Simenon, who was also a pipe smoker.
Mammy Yokum, American comics character from Li'l Abner.
Philip Mortimer, Belgian comics character from Blake and Mortimer.
L'Oncle Paul, Belgian comics character.
Paulus the woodgnome, Dutch comics character.
Madam Pheip, Belgian comics character from The Adventures of Nero. She is a bossy woman who always smokes a pipe. 
Piet Pienter, Belgian comics character from Piet Pienter en Bert Bibber.
Popeye, American comics and cartoon character, known for his corn pipe. 
Santa Claus, folklore character. Is described thus (1839): "The stub of a pipe he held clenched in his teeth."
Mister Fantastic, Marvel Comics character from the Fantastic Four smoked a pipe in early issues of the series.
Gandalf, Bilbo Baggins and other characters from The Lord of the Rings.

More examples can be found in the Pipe Smoker of the Year list.

Gallery

See also

For tobacco products
 Kiseru
 Midwakh
 Tobacco pipe

For cannabis
 Bong
 Cannabis pipe
 Chalice
 Chillum
 One hitter
 Sebsi

Other substances
 Opium pipe

References

External links

Pipes: Logos & Markings: Pipe brands by pictures.
Pipe Smoking: A history of pipe smoking and its modern-day practice.

 
Tobacciana